Fairview Dome is a prominent granite dome in Yosemite National Park, located  north of Cathedral Peak and  west of Tuolumne Meadows. Near Fairview Dome is Marmot Dome, linked by an area called Razor Back. Northwest is Hammer Dome.

John Muir wrote of the peak:

The north face route is popular with rock climbers and is listed in the classic guidebook Fifty Classic Climbs of North America. Routes vary in difficulty up to possibly class 5.11.

References

Granite domes of Yosemite National Park
Landforms of Tuolumne County, California
Hills of California